Eucithara bascauda is a small sea snail, a marine gastropod mollusk in the family Mangeliidae.

Description
The length of the shell attains 5.5 mm, its diameter 2.5 mm.

The pale ochraceous shell has an ovate shape with somewhat rounded whorls. The apical whorls are simple and smooth, the rest obliquely thickly costate, with transverse acute lirae. The interstices  are extremely minutely decussate. The aperture is oblong. The sinus is small, only half-hollowed out of the outer lip, and not extending across. The lip is much thickened, fimbriolate, within seven or eight denticles. The columella is straight and simple.

Distribution
This marine species occurs off New Caledonia.

References

External links
  Tucker, J.K. 2004 Catalog of recent and fossil turrids (Mollusca: Gastropoda). Zootaxa 682:1-1295

bascauda
Gastropods described in 1896